SAS Isandlwana (F146) is the second of four s for the South African Navy built by the European South African Corvette Consortium. SAS Isandlwana was named after the Battle of Isandlwana at a ceremony held in Kiel in December 2002, by Deputy Defence Minister Nozizwe Madlala-Routledge.

Construction
SAS Isandlwana was manufactured by the European South African Corvette Consortium (ESACC), consisting of the German Frigate Consortium (Blohm+Voss, Thyssen Rheinstahl and Howaldtswerke Deutsche Werft), African Defence Systems (part of the French Thales defense group) and a number of South African companies.

The ships were built to the MEKO modular design concept and are designated by the manufacturer as the MEKO A-200SAN class. Some controversy exists as to the class type of the vessel, with both the manufacturer and the South African Navy referring to her as a "corvette," but other similar vessels in other navies being referred to as frigates. Some have claimed the use of the word "corvette" was a political decision made by the South African government to ease criticism of the procurement of the vessels.

SAS Isandlwana was built at the Howaldtswerke-Deutsche Werft shipyards in Kiel, Germany, and she arrived in South Africa on 25 February 2004.

In 2007, SAS Isandlwana took part in the Atlasur Exercise in cooperation with the fleets of Brazil and Chile.

Namesake
As with all the other ships of the Valour class, Isandlwana is named after a famous South African battle or instance of great valour. In this case the famous Battle of Isandlwana between the Zulu nation and the British Empire, at the beginning of the Anglo-Zulu War.

Notable deployments
Exercise Atlasur VI
Expo Naval in Chile
Exercise Amazolo
Exercise Red Lion
Exercise Good Hope III
Exercise Ibsamar I
Exercise Atlasur VII

References

External links

 Valour class specifications
 Valour class homepage

Valour-class frigates
Ships built in Kiel
2002 ships
Frigates of the South African Navy
Military units and formations in Cape Town